The 2010 Women's European Volleyball League was the second edition of the annual women's volleyball tournament, played by eight European countries from June 5 to July 18, 2010. The final Four were held in Ankara, Turkey, on July 24 and 25.

Competing nations

League round

Pool A

|}

Leg 1

|}

Leg 2

|}

Leg 3

|}

Leg 4

|}

Leg 5

|}

Leg 6

|}

Leg 7

|}

Pool B

|}

Leg 1

|}

Leg 2

|}

Leg 3

|}

Leg 4

|}

Leg 5

|}

Leg 6

|}

Final four
The final Four will be held at Başkent Volleyball Hall in Ankara, Turkey, from July 24 to July 25.

Qualified teams
, as host

Semifinals

|}

Bronze medal match

|}

Final

|}

Final standing

Awards
MVP:  Jelena Nikolić
Best Scorer:  Neslihan Darnel
Best Spiker:  Jovana Brakočević
Best Blocker:  Eda Erdem
Best Server:  Strashimira Filipova 
Best Setter:  Maja Ognjenović
Best Libero:  Mariya Filipova
Best Receiver:  Jelena Nikolić

References

External links
 Official CEV Site

European Volleyball League
European Volleyball League
Women's European Volleyball League
League 2010
2010

de:Volleyball-Europaliga 2010